Vennila Veedu is a 2014 Indian Tamil-language drama film written and directed by Vetri Mahalingam. Produced by P. V. Arun, the film stars Mirchi Senthil, Vijayalakshmi, and Srinda. Cinematography is by D. Kannan, editing by V. J. Sabu Joseph, and the soundtrack is scored by Dhanraj Manickam. The film was released on 10 October 2014 to mixed reviews. The film is based on a theme similar to the short story The Necklace by Guy de Maupassant.

Plot 
A village couple, Karthik and Thenmozhi, migrate to the city after their marriage. Karthik works as a manager in a firm, and he and his wife live happily and help everyone around according to their capacity. They have a beautiful daughter, Vennila. Meanwhile, Ilavarasi, a new neighbour in their apartment, arrives. She lives right next door. Ilavarasi is the daughter of a rich moneylender and greedy loan shark (Vazhakku Enn Muthuraman) who goes to any extent to get his loaned money back from the people who borrowed it. He also loves his daughter and will get anything she points at and will do anything for her. Ilavarasi, as a result of this upbringing, is an arrogant, spoilt brat of a man and is married to a spineless man who does whatever she bids him to do. Though Thenu does not have a good opinion about Ilavarasi in the beginning, they become friends after an incident where Ilavarasi thrashes a stalker who was harassing Thenu repeatedly over the phone. Soon, the women become good friends, enjoy each other's company over the day, and spend a lot of time together.

One day, when Karthik and Thenu are preparing for a wedding in Karthik's employer's family, Thenu says that she has only a simple jewellery and will feel out of place and belittled at such a grand wedding. Since Karthik is not in a comfortable financial state to buy her some jewels, she decides to ask Ilavarasi if she could borrow her necklace and return it after the ceremony, and Ilavarasi also happily obliges. The trouble begins when a chain snatcher steals the necklace on their way back home.

When Ilavarasi's father learns of this, he becomes wild and scolds Thenu, Karthik, and even his own daughter. He asks Karthik to lodge a formal complaint to the police. The policemen's attitude towards this issue is lethargic, and they treat them with negligence. Meanwhile, the inspector tells Ilavarasi's father that while Thenu's own chain is still intact, his daughter's jewellery alone is gone, so even Thenu and Karthik could be possible suspects, and this kind of cheating is the latest trend among robbers these days. Ilavarasi's father hears this and poisons his daughter's mind. Ilavarasi also misjudges certain incidents with Thenu and distances herself slowly. One fine day, Ilavarasi throws a surprise party for Karthik and Thenu's wedding anniversary and gifts an expensive showpiece. However, day after day, Ilavarasi's father continues to verbally abuse them and looks at them as thieves. Then, Vennila suddenly gets kidnapped, and after some commotions, Karthik learns that Ilavarasi and her father have orchestrated the whole kidnap drama to check if they have the money from selling the stolen necklace. Karthik is enraged and argues with Ilavarasi's father, who asks him to first find the stolen necklace or at least give the money for the jewellery's worth and then talk as much as he pleases. Karthik, unable to see his family suffer humiliation, agrees to give back the money somehow.

Karthik goes to his village to sell a property, leaving Thenu and Vennila at home. However, here too, the land brokers make use of his helpless emergency situation and buy the land for exactly the amount that Karthik owes Ilavarasi's father, much lesser than the land's actual worth. Karthik comes back to the city with the money but is in for a rude shock. He finds that Thenu has committed suicide by hanging herself. He reads her suicide note, where she tells that there was a secret camera in the gift that Ilavarasi gave for their anniversary, and their intimate moments were filmed and leaked to the internet. Her stalker had seen this and verbally abused her in public. When she confronted Ilavarasi and her father about this, he told that they fixed the camera only to monitor their activities to find the truth about the theft and they are not responsible if the video is leaked to the internet. When she argued with him, he slapped and humiliated her further. Unable to bear all the humiliation, she has taken this extreme step.

Karthik is blinded with fury after reading this, and when Ilavarasi's father comes to get his money, he gives it to him and asks him to return his dead wife. This leads to an argument, and he is beaten up by goons, but he bashes all of them and finally strangles Ilavarasi's father to death with his own gold chains. Except Ilavarasi, nobody else stops Karthik. At the end, we see Karthik crying out loud, looking at the state that he left his baby daughter Vennila in.

Cast 
 Senthil as Karthik
 Vijayalakshmi as Thenmozhi (Thenu)
 Srinda as Ilavarasi
 Vazhakku Enn Muthuraman as Ilavarasi's father
 Baby Mithra as Vennila
 Pandi
 VJ Settai Senthil
 VJ Dindugal Saravanan
 Avan Ivan Ramaraj

 Special appearance in promo song
 Sivakarthikeyan
 Premji Amaren
 Venkat Prabhu
 Udhayanidhi Stalin
 Kreshna
 Sreeja Chandran of Saravannan Meenatchi fame
 Ram Saravana

Soundtrack 
The soundtrack album was composed by Dhanraj Manickam. The lyrics were written by Vetri Mahalingam and Kabilan. The track 'Johny Johny' sung by Gana Bala was released as a single on 23 July 2013. The single track is a mish-mash of the famous nursery rhymes 'Johny Johny Yes Papa', 'Baa Baa Black Sheep', 'Twinkle Twinkle Little Star' and the Airtel song 'Ovvoru Friendum Theva Machan'. The audio CD was released by director Cheran and received by Thamizhachi Thangapandian and director R. K. Selvamani.

 Tracklist

References

External links 
 

2010s Tamil-language films
2014 drama films
2014 films
Indian drama films